Television in Tunisia reaches 94% of households. The dominant platform in the market is free satellite, though terrestrial platform reaches around 15% of the households. The country has seventeen free-to-air channels, two of which are owned and operated by the state-owned Télévision Tunisienne (formerly ERTT), El Watania 1 and El Watania 2. The two state-owned channels have undergone management changes since the 2011 revolution, and consequently changes in programming and content.

History 
It was officially introduced to the country on May 31, 1966, with the launch of state-owned Radio Télévision Tunisienne (now El Watania 1), broadcast from its first transmitter in Djebel Zaghouan. The service broadcast in both Arabic and French. By 1971, television became available in all of Tunisia.

Most-viewed channels
Viewing shares, March 2015:

See also
 Media of Tunisia
 List of newspapers in Tunisia

References

 
Television stations